Hypatima manjakatompo is a moth in the family Gelechiidae. It was described by Viette in 1956. It is found in Madagascar.

References

Hypatima
Moths described in 1956